Groendyke Transport is a tank truck carrier in the United States with headquarters in Enid, Oklahoma. The company was founded on July 12, 1932, by H.C. Groendyke as the sole proprietor and incorporated in 1949. The company currently has 41 terminals in 15 states hauling more than 480,000 loads annually of chemicals, acids, fuels, lubricants, flour, and vegetable oils throughout the United States, Canada, and Mexico, as an ISO 9001 registered carrier.

History 
Before the company's founding, refined fuels were transported by railcar. A young Harold Groendyke saw an opportunity and took it creating a tank truck industry. In 1935, H.C. Groendyke moved the company headquarters to Enid, Ok (where it remains today) to be closer to Eason oil and Champlin refineries. The company was incorporated in 1949. Groendyke Transport continued to expand and in 1965 the company became international. It made its first delivery into Mexico. The company continued to expand throughout the 1970s and 1980s and made its first trip to Canada in 1988. The company is also known as a "military friendly" employer for veterans. The current CEO of Groendyke Transport is H.C. Groendyke's son John D. Groendyke  The President is Greg Hodgen and COO is David Snapp.

Terminals 
The company has terminal locations in Arizona, Arkansas, Colorado, Florida, Georgia (U.S. state), Illinois, Kansas, Louisiana, New Mexico, North Carolina, Oklahoma, South Carolina, Texas and Wyoming.  They ship many different materials in and out of these terminals on a daily basis. They also have some international business.

Company size 
As of 2010б the company has an annual revenue of $200 million and employs a staff of approximately 1,325. The company website list that Groendyke is the 6th largest tank truck carrier in the U.S.

Awards 
Groendyke is a seven-time recipient of the Heil safety award trophy. The award is presented by National Tank Truck Carriers (NTTC) with Heil Trailers International as a co-sponsor.

References

External links 
Groendyke Official Website
Moving Companies Bronx

Trucking companies of the United States
Companies based in Oklahoma
Transportation companies based in Oklahoma